Cass County is a county located in the U.S. state of Indiana. As of the 2010 United States Census, its population was 38,966. The county seat is Logansport.
Cass County comprises the Logansport, IN Micropolitan Statistical Area.

History
Cass County was formed in 1828. It is named for Gen. Lewis Cass, 2nd Territorial Governor of Michigan and later U.S. Secretary of War under President Andrew Jackson.

Geography
The Wabash River flows westward through the county, and is joined by the Eel River in Logansport.

Adjacent counties

 Fulton County - north
 Miami County - east
 Howard County - south
 Carroll County - southwest
 White County - west
 Pulaski County - northwest

City
 Logansport

Towns
 Galveston
 Onward
 Royal Center
 Walton

Census-designated place
 Grissom AFB (mostly in Miami Co.)

Unincorporated places

 Adamsboro
 Anoka
 Clymers
 Deacon
 Dunkirk
 Georgetown
 Hoover
 Kenneth
 Lake Cicott
 Lewisburg
 Lincoln
 Lucerne
 Metea
 Miami Bend
 Mount Pleasant
 New Waverly
 Potawatomi Point
 Twelve Mile
 Young America

Extinct towns
 Circleville
 Taberville (absorbed into Logansport)
 Taberville (Actually OP Taberville platted in 1853, located on the south side of Logansport)

Townships

 Adams
 Bethlehem
 Boone
 Clay
 Clinton
 Deer Creek
 Eel
 Harrison
 Jackson
 Jefferson
 Miami
 Noble
 Tipton
 Washington

Major highways

  U.S. Route 24
  U.S. Route 35
  Indiana State Road 16
  Indiana State Road 17
  Indiana State Road 18
  Indiana State Road 25
  Indiana State Road 29
  Indiana State Road 218

Railroads
 Norfolk Southern Railway
 Winamac Southern Railroad
 Logansport and Eel River Shortline Company
 Toledo, Peoria and Western Railway

Climate and weather

Government

The county government is a constitutional body, and is granted specific powers by the Constitution of Indiana, and by the Indiana Code.

County Council: The legislative branch of the county government; controls spending and revenue collection in the county. Representatives are elected to four-year terms from county districts. They are responsible for setting salaries, the annual budget, and special spending. The council has limited authority to impose local taxes, in the form of an income and property tax that is subject to state level approval, excise taxes, and service taxes.

Board of Commissioners: The executive body of the county; commissioners are elected county-wide to staggered four-year terms. One commissioner serves as president. The commissioners execute acts legislated by the council, collect revenue, and manage the day-to-day functions of the county government.

Court: The county maintains a small claims court that can handle some civil cases. The judge on the court is elected to four-year terms, and must be a member of the Indiana Bar Association. The judge is assisted by a constable who is also elected to a four-year term. In some cases, court decisions can be appealed to the state level circuit court.

County Officials: The county has several other elected offices, including sheriff, coroner, auditor, treasurer, recorder, surveyor, and circuit court clerk. They are elected to four-year terms. Members elected to county government positions are required to declare a party affiliation and to be residents of the county.

Most of Cass County is in Indiana's 4th congressional district; the extreme eastern edge is part of Indiana's 2nd congressional district. It is also part of Indiana Senate district 18 and Indiana House of Representatives districts 16 and 24.

Demographics

As of the 2010 United States Census, there were 38,966 people, 14,858 households, and 10,144 families in the county. The racial makeup of the county was 88.2% white, 1.5% black or African American, 1.1% Asian, 0.5% American Indian, 0.1% Pacific islander, 7.0% from other races, and 1.6% from two or more races. Those of Hispanic or Latino origin made up 12.6% of the population. In terms of ancestry, 24.0% were German, 15.0% were American, 11.8% were Irish, and 9.0% were English.

Of the 14,858 households, 33.3% had children under the age of 18 living with them, 51.8% were married couples living together, 11.3% had a female householder with no husband present, 31.7% were non-families, and 27.3% of all households were made up of individuals. The average household size was 2.55 and the average family size was 3.08. The median age was 38.7 years.

The median income for a household in the county was $47,697 and the median income for a family was $49,873. Males had a median income of $37,823 versus $26,938 for females. The per capita income for the county was $20,562. About 9.8% of families and 14.0% of the population were below the poverty line, including 18.7% of those under age 18 and 8.0% of those age 65 or over.

2020 Census

As of the 2020 United States Census, there were 37,870 people.

Notable people
 Rollie Zeider (1883–1967), major league baseball player (1910–1918); born in Hoover.
 Film actor Greg Kinnear was born in Logansport.
Cpl. Humberto Sanchez (1998-2021) a U.S. Marine who was among the 13 service members killed in the 2021 Bombing of the Kabul Hamid Karzai International Airport.

Education
Public schools in Cass County are administered by the Logansport Community School Corporation, the Pioneer Regional School Corporation and the Southeastern School Corporation.

High Schools and Middle Schools

 6th Grade Academy
 Lewis Cass High School
 Logansport Junior High School
 Logansport High School
 Pioneer Junior – Senior High School

Elementary Schools

 Columbia Elementary School
 Fairview Elementary School
 Franklin Elementary School
 Galveston Elementary School
 Landis Elementary School
 Pioneer Elementary School
 Thompson Elementary School

See also
 List of public art in Cass County, Indiana
 National Register of Historic Places listings in Cass County, Indiana

Further reading
 Powell, Jehu Z. History of Cass County Indiana: From its earliest settlement to the present time : with biographical sketches and reference to biographies previously compiled, Volume 1. Lewis Publishing Company (1913).

References

External links
 

 
Indiana counties
1829 establishments in Indiana
Populated places established in 1829